The 1982–83 international cricket season was from September 1982 to April 1983.

Season overview

September

Sri Lanka in India

Australia in Pakistan

November

England in Australia

December

India in Pakistan

January

1982–83 Benson & Hedges World Series

February

England in New Zealand

India in the West Indies

March

Sri Lanka in New Zealand

1982-83 Bushfire Appeal Challenge

April

Australia in Sri Lanka

References

International cricket competitions by season
1982 in cricket
1983 in cricket